The River Tower at Christina Landing is a high rise located in Wilmington, Delaware. It is the tallest residential building in both the city of Wilmington and the state of Delaware, rising 25 stories with a 13th floor, and 295 ft (90m.). The Building was constructed in 2005, and opened in 2007. The tower was designed by Stantec Architecture, Inc.

This skyscraper's main purpose is as a residential building. It contains a pool, Jacuzzi, and a sitting area on the roof.  There is also space reserved for parties.

The skyscraper also has eight stories of parking garage for residents who live there.

See also
 List of tallest buildings in Wilmington, Delaware
 Wilmington, Delaware

References

Residential skyscrapers in Delaware
Residential buildings completed in 2007
Skyscrapers in Wilmington, Delaware
2007 establishments in Delaware